Vladimir Rokhlin may refer to:

Vladimir Abramovich Rokhlin (1919–1984), Soviet mathematician
Vladimir Rokhlin Jr. (born 1952), mathematician and computer scientist, son of Vladimir Abramovich Rokhlin